This is a list of Sri Lanka Freedom Party MPs. It includes all parliamentarians that were elected to the Parliament of Sri Lanka representing the Sri Lanka Freedom Party from 1951 to onwards. The names in bold are the members of the party that became the President/Prime Minister of Sri Lanka.

List of Parliamentarians

A 
 A. L. Abdul Majeed
 Rohitha Abeygunawardena
 Mahinda Yapa Abeywardena
 M. C. Ahamed
 Lasantha Alagiyawanna
 Mahinda Amaraweera
 Dilum Amunugama
 Sarath Amunugama (politician)
 C. Arulampalam
 M. W. Aruna Pradeep
 Ferial Ashraff

B 
 Tissa Balalla
 Sirimavo Bandaranaike
 S. W. R. D. Bandaranaike
 S. D. Bandaranayake
 Tharanath Basnayaka
 Bandula Basnayake

C 
 C. A. S. Marikkar
 S. M. Chandrasena
 Reginald Cooray

D 
 Wijaya Dahanayake
 Ananda Dassanayake
 Berty Premalal Dissanayake
 Lalith Dissanayake
 Rohana Dissanayake
 Salinda Dissanayake
 Alfred Duraiappah

E 
 Nandimithra Ekanayake
 Sarath Ekanayake
 T. B. Ekanayake

F 
 Arundika Fernando
 Eraj Ravindra Fernando
 Milroy Fernando
 Jeyaraj Fernandopulle
 A. H. M. Fowzie

G 
 Piyasena Gamage
 Siripala Gamalath
 Sarath Kumara Gunaratna
 Nanda Gunasinghe
 Nandana Gunathilake
 Sarana Gunawardena

H 
 Jayarathna Herath
 Kanaka Herath
 Maheepala Herath
 Sanjeewa Hulangamuwa

J 
 Sisira Jayakody
 Anuradha Jayaratne
 D. M. Jayaratne
 Piyankara Jayaratne
 Premalal Jayasekara
 Sumedha Jayasena

K 
 Lakshman Kadirgamar
 Jeewan Kumaranatunga

M 
 M. K. A. D. S. Gunawardana
 M. N. Abdul Majeed
 Nandana Mendis
 H. R. Mithrapala
 Mohan De Silva (politician)
 Vinayagamoorthy Muralitharan
 Nishantha Muthuhettigamage

N 
 Hemakumara Nanayakkara
 A. M. M. Naushad
 S. B. Nawinne
 Neranjan Wickremasinghe

O 
 James Peter Obeyesekere III

P 
 Jaya Pathirana
 Felix Perera
 Lakshman Wasantha Perera
 Victor Anthony Perera
 A. P. Jagath Pushpakumara
 Rohana Pushpakumara

R 
 Mahinda Rajapaksa
 Namal Rajapaksa
 Nirupama Rajapaksa
 Wijeyadasa Rajapakshe
 Tellipalai Rajaratnam
 Angajan Ramanathan
 Ramesh Pathirana
 Prasanna Ranatunga
 Ruwan Ranatunga
 Jayatissa Ranaweera
 Ranjith de Zoysa
 S. M. Ranjith
 C. B. Rathnayake
 Anuruddha Ratwatte
 Roshan Ranasinghe
 Neil Rupasinghe

S 
 Sanee Rohana Kodithuvakku
 Sarath Chandrasiri Muthukumarana
 Wasantha Senanayake
 John Seneviratne
 Asanka Shehan Semasinghe
 Duminda Silva
 Shan Wijayalal De Silva
 Maithripala Sirisena

T 
 Janaka Bandara Tennakoon
 S. Thambirajah
 A. Thiagarajah
 Dayasritha Thissera

V 
 Amith Thenuka Vidanagamage
 Vidura Wickremenayake
 Vijitha Berugoda

W 
 Janaka Wakkumbura
 Pavithra Wanniarachchi
 Wiswa Warnapala
 Gunaratna Weerakoon
 Eric Prasanna Weerawardena
 Kumara Welgama
 Jayantha Wijesekara
 Mahinda Wijesekara
 Duleep Wijesekera

See also 
 Sri Lanka Freedom Party history

Freedom Party